The 1977 Los Angeles Dodgers season saw Tommy Lasorda in his first full season at the helm of the Dodgers, replacing longtime manager Walter Alston as manager of the team near the end of the previous season. The Dodgers won the National League West by 10 games and defeated the Philadelphia Phillies in four games in the NLCS, then lost to the New York Yankees in the World Series. This edition of the Dodgers featured the first quartet of teammates that hit 30 or more home runs: Steve Garvey with 33, Reggie Smith with 32, and Dusty Baker and Ron Cey, who both hit 30. The Dodgers duplicated this feat again 20 years later in 1997.

Offseason
December 20, 1976: Ted Sizemore was traded by the Dodgers to the Philadelphia Phillies for Johnny Oates and a player to be named later. The Phillies completed the deal by sending Quincy Hill (minors) to the Dodgers on January 4, 1977.
January 11, 1977: Bill Buckner, Iván DeJesús and Jeff Albert (minors) were traded by the Dodgers to the Chicago Cubs for Rick Monday and Mike Garman.
February 7, 1977: Rick Auerbach was traded by the Dodgers to the New York Mets for Hank Webb and Richard Sander (minors).

Regular season

Season standings

Record vs. opponents

Opening Day lineup

Notable transactions
September 2, 1977: John Hale was claimed off waivers from the Dodgers by the Toronto Blue Jays.
September 2, 1977: Henry Cruz was claimed off waivers from the Dodgers by the Chicago White Sox.
September 8, 1977: Kevin Pasley was sold by the Dodgers to the Seattle Mariners.

Roster

Player stats

Batting

Starters by position
Note: Pos = Position; G = Games played; AB = At bats; H = Hits; Avg. = Batting average; HR = Home runs; RBI = Runs batted in

Other batters
Note: G = Games played; AB = At bats; H = Hits; Avg. = Batting average; HR = Home runs; RBI = Runs batted in

Pitching

Starting pitchers
Note: G = Games pitched; IP = Innings pitched; W = Wins; L = Losses; ERA = Earned run average; SO = Strikeouts

Other pitchers
Note: G = Games pitched; IP = Innings pitched; W = Wins; L = Losses; ERA = Earned run average; SO = Strikeouts

Relief pitchers
Note: G = Games pitched; W = Wins; L = Losses; SV = Saves; ERA = Earned run average; SO = Strikeouts

Postseason

1977 National League Championship Series

Game One
October 4, Dodger Stadium

Game Two
October 5, Dodger Stadium

Game Three
October 7, Veterans Stadium

Game Four
October 8, Veterans Stadium

1977 World Series

Awards and honors
1977 Major League Baseball All-Star Game
Steve Garvey starter
Don Sutton starter
Ron Cey starter
Reggie Smith reserve
Major League Baseball All-Star Game MVP Award
Don Sutton
NLCS Most Valuable Player
Dusty Baker
Gold Glove Award
Steve Garvey
TSN National League All-Star
Steve Garvey
NL Player of the Month
Ron Cey (April 1977)
NL Player of the Week
Ron Cey (Apr. 18–24)
Steve Garvey (June 20–26)
Tommy John (Aug. 8–14)

Farm system

Teams in BOLD won League Championships

Major League Baseball Draft

The Dodgers drafted 40 players in the June draft and eight in the January draft. Of those, eight players would eventually play in the Major Leagues.

The first round draft pick in the June draft was pitcher Bob Welch from Eastern Michigan University. In 17 years with the Dodgers and Oakland Athletics he started 462 games with a 211–146 record and a 3.47 ERA. He became a two time All-Star, a two time World Series Champion and won the 1990 American League Cy Young Award.

The draft also included Mickey Hatcher, who hit .280 in 1130 games, mostly as an outfielder and was a part of two Dodgers World Series champions; outfielder/utility player Ron Roenicke who played eight seasons in the Majors before becoming a coach and manager; and relief pitcher Tom Niedenfuer, who was picked in the 36th round but would play 10 seasons in the Majors and save 97 games.

Notes

References
Baseball-Reference season page
Baseball Almanac season page

External links
1977 Los Angeles Dodgers uniform
Los Angeles Dodgers official web site

Los Angeles Dodgers seasons
Los Angeles Dodgers season
National League West champion seasons
National League champion seasons
Los Angel